Suresh Abaji Khopade (born 1 June 1951) is an Indian writer and a retired Indian Police Service (IPS) officer. He is a pioneer of community policing initiatives in the state of Maharashtra. He is well known for safeguarding then hyper-sensitive town Bhiwandi during the 1992 communal Riots. He is a recipient of the President's Medal for Gallantry in 1993. He retired as Special Inspector General of CID.

He also has established a conceptual school near a small village Morgaon in Baramati taluk of Pune District, named 'Koodachi shala', which is not a school in traditional sense, but a place which can best be described as a tourist point for school-going children. Many schools visit this place to have an interesting learning experience about all spheres of life.

On 13 March 2014 he was named as an Aam Aadmi Party candidate for Baramati South Lok Sabha constituency.

References

External links 
 Suresh Khopade Official Website

1951 births
Living people
Aam Aadmi Party candidates in the 2014 Indian general election
Indian police chiefs
Indian civil servants
Mahatma Phule Krishi Vidyapeeth alumni
Marathi-language writers
Aam Aadmi Party politicians
21st-century Indian politicians
Marathi politicians
Maharashtra politicians